Thelma Maria Doran was the Irish Ambassador to China from November 1991 until November 1995. While in China, she was the non-resident Ambassador to Pakistan and the Philippines.  She became Ambassador to Poland in September 2001 (with concurrent accreditation to Lithuania and Latvia). She served as Ambassador to Norway from 8 September 2005 until 14 January 2008.  

She has also served as Ambassador to Austria, Permanent Representative of Ireland to the United Nations, and non-resident Ambassador to the Slovak Republic and the Republic of Slovenia. 

Doran graduated from University College Dublin (UCD) with a BA in 1965 and a H Dip in Education the following year. She taught for five years teaching before joining the Department of Foreign Affairs.

References

Ambassadors of Ireland to China
Irish women ambassadors
Ambassadors of Ireland to Austria
Ambassadors of Ireland to Norway
Ambassadors of Ireland to Poland
Ambassadors of Ireland to Slovakia
Ambassadors of Ireland to Slovenia
Ambassadors of Ireland to Pakistan
Ambassadors of Ireland to the Philippines
Alumni of University College Dublin
Ambassadors of Ireland to Latvia
Ambassadors of Ireland to Lithuania
Irish women educators